Triplex or XXX was the code name of a British espionage operation in World War II which involved secretly copying the contents of diplomatic pouches of neutral countries.

Due to travel security restrictions to and from Britain during some periods of the war, the government was able to forbid the use of the embassies' own couriers to transport pouches or was able to separate the courier from the pouch to "sensor" the passenger. This provided opportunities to access the pouch and copy the contents for later analysis.

Anthony Blunt, while working for MI5, was a supervisor of the Triplex operation.

References 

United Kingdom intelligence operations
World War II espionage
Code names
Diplomatic immunity and protection